José Vivó (19 May 1917 – 26 July 1989) was a Spanish television, theater and film actor.

Life
He studied engineering, but the Spanish Civil War forced him to leave his studies unfinished. He fought on the side of the Republican army and at the end of the conflict, he devoted himself fully to the world of acting. His career began in the theater in 1946. In 1950 he moved to Madrid where he remained for the rest of his professional life.

Among his most notable films are: Bienvenido Mister Marshall (1953), La venganza de Don Mendo (1961), Las Ibéricas F.C. (1971), Ana y los lobos (1973), Las largas vacaciones del 36 (1976),  Mamá cumple cien años (1979), El crimen de Cuenca (1980), Asesinato en el Comité Central (1982), El Sur (1983), El caballero del dragón (1985) and El Lute (camina o revienta) (1987).

He also worked extensible on the theater, but it was for his appearances in television where he became best known. He began his career on T.V since the start of this medium in Spain in the 1950s, taking part in a great number of programs until shortly before his death.

Partial filmography

 Costa Brava (1946)
 La casa de las sonrisas (1948) - Julio
 Doce horas de vida (1949) - Luis
 Tiempos felices (1950)
 Saturday Night (1950)
 La trinca del aire (1951)
 Welcome Mr. Marshall! (1953) - Secretario
 The Italians They Are Crazy (1958)
 Don Mendo's Revenche (1962) - Marqués de la Moncada
 Las nenas del mini-mini (1969) - Padre de Mao
 El certificado (1970) - Consul de Venezuela
 Las ibéricas F.C. (1971) - Entrenador del equipo contrario
 Las melancólicas (1971) - Doctor
 The Scarlet Letter (1973)
 Flor de santidad (1973) - Cardenal
 Ana and the Wolves (1973) - Juan
 Cebo para una adolescente (1974) - Antonio
 Vida conyugal sana (1974) - Gutiérrez
 El chulo (1974)
 Vera, un cuento cruel (1974) - Notario (Don Carlos)
 Sex o no sex (1974) - Psicoanalista
 Doctor, me gustan las mujeres, ¿es grave? (1974) - Don Joaquín
 El asesino no está solo (1975) - Raimundo
 El vicio y la virtud (1975) - Lozano
 Madrid, Costa Fleming (1976) - Iturriaga
 Long Vacations of 36 (1976) - Alberto
 Cuando los maridos se iban a la guerra (1976) - Físico
 La ciutat cremada (1976) - Doctor Robert
 Volvoreta (1976) - Preco
 El segundo poder (1976) - Hornachuelos
 El hombre que supo amar (1977) - Don Luis
 El puente (1977) - (uncredited)
 El perro (1977) - Sebastián
 El último guateque (1978) - (uncredited)
 El sacerdote (1978) - Obispo
 Cabo de vara (1978)
 Traffic Jam (1979) - Mercedes passenger
 El día del presidente (1979) - Ministro de Sanidad
 Mama Turns 100 (1979) - Juan
 El buscón (1979) - Alonso
 The Crime of Cuenca (1980) - Don Rufo
 Los fieles sirvientes (1980) - Álvarez
 La plaça del Diamant (1982) - Mossèn Vivó
 Asesinato en el Comité Central (1982) - Fonseca
 La colmena (1982) - Prestamista
 Femenino singular (1982) - Padre de Luisa
 El Sur (1983) - Camarero
 Panic Beats (1983) - Dr. Rigaud
 La bestia y la espada mágica (1983) - Liutprando de Cremona
 La mujer del juez (1984) - Padre de Paz / Paz's father
 El jardín secreto (1984) - (uncredited)
 Mon ami Washington (1984)
 Padre nuestro (1985) - Papa
 Luces de bohemia (1985) - Zaratustra
 Caso cerrado (1985) - Director de la prisión
 The Knight of the Dragon (1985) - Count of Rue
 La noche de la ira (1986) - Matías
 El hermano bastardo de Dios (1986)
 Policía (1987) - Narcotraficante
 La guerra de los locos (1987)
 El Lute: Run for Your Life (1987) - Ministro
 Jarrapellejos (1988) - Conde
 La diputada (1988) - Solana
 Diario de invierno (1988)
 La punyalada (1990) - Avi

References

External links
 

1917 births
1989 deaths
Spanish male film actors
Spanish male television actors
Spanish military personnel of the Spanish Civil War (Republican faction)
20th-century Spanish male actors